The Hitra official football team is the official football team for the Norwegian municipality of Hitra. They are not affiliated with FIFA or UEFA. Hitra is a member of the International Island Games Association and has taken part in Football at the Island Games.

Selected internationals

External links 
Hitra on www.fedefutbol.net
Hitra on www.rsssf.com

National football team
Hitra
Football teams in Norway